Gartenflora was a German illustrated botanical magazine published in the period 1852–1940.

History
Founded in 1852 and edited by Eduard von Regel, the botanist and future director of the Saint Petersburg Botanical Garden, the magazine appeared on a monthly basis. It was first published in Erlangen by Ferdinand Enke. Eduard von Regel left the editorial post in 1885.

The publication was titled:

References

External links
Gallery of Gartenflora images
Gallery at 'Plantillustrations'
The History of Kanna
Gartenflora issues

Gardening magazines
1852 establishments in Germany
1940 disestablishments in Germany
Defunct magazines published in Germany
German-language magazines
Magazines established in 1852
Magazines disestablished in 1940
Monthly magazines published in Germany